Paracles severa is a moth of the subfamily Arctiinae first described by Carlos Berg in 1875. It is found in Argentina.

References

Moths described in 1875
Paracles